A total solar eclipse  occurred on March 7, 1970, visible across most of North America and Central America.

A solar eclipse occurs when the Moon passes between Earth and the Sun, thereby totally or partly obscuring the image of the Sun for a viewer on Earth. A total solar eclipse occurs when the Moon's apparent diameter is larger than the Sun's, blocking all direct sunlight, turning day into darkness. Totality occurs in a narrow path across Earth's surface, with the partial solar eclipse visible over a surrounding region thousands of kilometres wide. Occurring only 1.3 days after perigee (Perigee on March 6, 1970 at 09:32 UTC), the Moon's apparent diameter was larger than the Sun and thus fulfilled this condition.

Totality was visible across southern Mexico and the Gulf of Mexico, the southeast Atlantic coast of the United States, northeast to the Maritimes of eastern Canada, and northern Miquelon-Langlade in the French overseas collectivity of Saint Pierre and Miquelon.

Greatest eclipse occurred over Mexico at 11:38 am CST, with totality lasting 3 minutes and 27.65 seconds. Totality over the U.S. lasted up to 3 minutes and 10 seconds. The media declared Perry as the first municipality in Florida to be in the eclipse direct path.

Inclement weather obstructed the viewing from that location and most of the eclipse path through the remainder of the southern states. There will not be an eclipse with a greater duration of totality over the contiguous U.S. until April 8, 2024, a period of 54 years.

Scientific effects
This eclipse slowed a radio transmission of atomic time from North Carolina to Washington, D.C.

Images

Related eclipses

Solar eclipses of 1968–1971

Saros 139

Tritos series

Metonic series

In popular culture 
CBS first color broadcast of a total eclipse.

The eclipse may be referenced in the hit popular song “You're So Vain” by Carly Simon, although in context, the lyrics more closely align with a different eclipse two years later.

Notes

References

Maps:
 GoogleMap of totality and partiality limits

News:
 ABC NEWS 3:40 – March 7, 1970: Total Solar Eclipse The region near Nejapa, Mexico, is first to experience total darkness in midday.

Photos and observations
 Russia expedition
 Foto Solar eclipse of March 7, 1970
 Solar Eclipse Photo Gallery 1 1970–1984, Photographs by Fred Espenak, from Windsor, NC
 Observations of coronal polarization at the solar eclipse of 7 March, 1970 Polarigraphic observations of the 7 March 1970 eclipse were made at Miahuatlán (Mexico)
 Solar Eclipse of March 7, 1970 Williamston, NC by Gerard M Foley

1970 03 07
1970 in science
1970 03 07
March 1970 events